Malykhin is a Russian masculine surname, its feminine counterpart is Malykhina. Notable people with the surname include:

Fedor Malykhin (born 1990), Russian ice hockey player 
Mikhail Malykhin (born 1986), Russian footballer

Russian-language surnames